During the 2000–01 German football season, FC Energie Cottbus competed in the Bundesliga.

Season summary
Cottbus finished 14th in the Bundesliga.

Results

Bundesliga

First-team squad
Squad at end of season

Left club during season

References

FC Energie Cottbus seasons
German football clubs 2000–01 season